Paul Kenneth Harrison ( 1949 – March 4, 2019) was an American football and basketball coach and athletic director. He was the first coach in UMass Dartmouth history as he coached there for their first five seasons. He also coached basketball for Massasoit Community College along with being the athletic directors for Martha's Vineyard Regional High School, Framingham High School, and Northbrook Academy.

Early life and education 
Harrison was born in 1949 in Middleborough, Massachusetts. He was the son of Paul and Winona Harrison. He attended and graduated from Andover Institute of Business with an Associate degree, Unity College with a Bachelor's degree in science, and Suffolk University for his Master's degree.

Coaching career

Football 
Until 1983, Harrison coached high school football for Middleborough High School.

In 1984, Harrison coached Dennis-Yarmouth Regional High School.

In 1985, Harrison was hired by UMass Dartmouth to be the team's first head coach in program history. For the first three seasons he lead the team as it was only a club team. In 1988, the team's first non-club season, he led them to a 5–4 record with their first win ever coming against Western New England 23–15. The following season would be his last with the team as they went 2–7.

In 2017, Harrison returned to UMass Dartmouth as a volunteer assistant coach.

Basketball 
Until 1983, Harrison coached Middleborough High School as a basketball coach alongside being the football coach. He coached his younger brother, David.

In 1999, Harrison was hired by Massasoit Community College to be their women's basketball head coach, replacing Mike Boyle after a season without a team. In two seasons with the team he led them to a 16–26 record, neither of them above .500.

Head coaching record

College football

College basketball

Administrative career 
From 2001 until Harrison's death in 2019, he was the athletic director for Martha's Vineyard Regional High School, Framingham High School, and Northbrook Academy. For Northbrook he was also the headmaster.

Personal life 
For 31 years, Harrison was a teacher of business and social studies at Middleborough High School.

For 22 years, Harrison coached tennis for boys and girls throughout many summer camps.

Harrison was a founding father and minister to the Rochester Congregational Church.

References

External links 

 UMass Dartmouth Corsairs bio

1949 births
2019 deaths
UMass Dartmouth Corsairs football coaches
High school football coaches in Massachusetts
People from Middleborough, Massachusetts
High school basketball coaches in Massachusetts
College basketball coaches in the United States